Cornfield  or corn field refers to a field of maize, wheat or other cereal crop.

Cornfield may also refer to:

Places
 Cornfields, Arizona, United States
 Cornfields, KwaZulu-Natal, South Africa
 The Cornfield (Fly Creek, New York), a historic social hall

People
 Cornfield (surname), a list of persons with the name

Art
 The Cornfield, an 1826 oil painting by the English artist John Constable
 Not A Cornfield, a 2005 art project in Los Angeles
 Song of the Cornfields, a 1947 Hungarian drama film

Other uses
 Miller's Cornfield, a section of the Antietam battlefield of the American Civil War

See also
 Corn (disambiguation)